Garz could refer to one of several places:
 Garz (Havelberg) - part of the city of Havelberg, Stendal, Saxony-Anhalt
 Garz (Rügen) - a city on the island of Rügen, Germany
 Garz (Usedom) - a smaller town on the island of Usedom adjacent to the Heringsdorf Airport and the city of Świnoujście, Poland
 Groß Garz ("Great Garz")  — a municipality in the district of Stendal, Saxony-Anhalt.